Mika Urbaniak (born Michelle Urbaniak in 1980 in New York City) is an American pop singer. She is a daughter of prominent Polish jazz musicians Urszula Dudziak and Michał Urbaniak. Born and raised in the United States, she has lived in Warsaw and London since 2001. Her style is a mixture of pop, jazz and hip-hop. In 2010, she won the Polish Society of the Phonographic Industry award Fryderyk in the category Album of the Year - Pop.

History
Mika Urbaniak started writing her own songs at the age of 11. When she was 14, she performed on stage for the first time. A year later, the first song with her vocals was released. For many years, she collaborated with major Polish artists, such as Smolik, Michał Urbaniak, Grzegorz Markowski, Mieczysław Szcześniak, Novika, O.S.T.R., Liroy and Kayah.

Urbaniak's debut album Closer was released on 27 April 2009 through Sony Music Poland and peaked at no. 2 on the Polish sales chart OLiS. The album was promoted by singles "In My Dreams" and "Lovin' Needs a Deadline", which charted at Polish Radio's chart LP3. In 2010, Closer won the Fryderyk award for Pop Album of the Year.

Her second album, Follow You, released on 24 April 2012, peaked at no. 12. Two songs promoting the album were released in 2012, "Pixelated" and "Don't Speak Too Loud", and both charted at LP3. A music video for the title track "Follow You" was released on YouTube on 1 February 2013.

Discography

Studio albums

Music videos

Awards and nominations

Fryderyk

|-
|2010 || Closer || Album of the Year - Pop ||

External links
 https://www.mikaurbaniak.co.uk

References

1980 births
Living people
American emigrants to Poland
Singers from New York City
Polish jazz singers
Polish pop singers
Polish R&B singers
English-language singers from Poland
21st-century American singers
21st-century Polish singers
21st-century Polish women singers